Mocoiasura suturalis is a species of beetle in the family Cerambycidae, and the only species in the genus Mocoiasura. It was described by Melzer in 1931.

References

Hemilophini
Beetles described in 1931